The Serre Mourene is a pyrenean summit, located on the Franco-Spanish border between the cirques of Troumouse and Barrosa, culminating at ; it is the second highest summit of the massif de la Munia after the pic de la Munia.

Topography
The summit is located on the pyrenean watershed in the central Pyrenees between the summits of la Munia and Troumouse.

See also
List of Pyrenean three-thousanders

References

Landforms of Hautes-Pyrénées
Mountains of the Pyrenees
Mountains of Hautes-Pyrénées
Pyrenean three-thousanders